Isaac Godfrey Geoffrey Nabwana, popularly known as Nabwana I.G.G., is a Ugandan filmmaker and film producer. Nabwana, the founder of the film studio Wakaliwood, is best known for the gratuitous violence in his films. Nabwana started to gain fame after uploading a trailer for his film Who Killed Captain Alex? on YouTube in 2010 and later the actual film in 2015. The film gained a cult status and as of January 2023, sits at 8.2+ million views on YouTube.

Personal life
Nabwana was born in Uganda during the regime of Idi Amin in 1973. During the Ugandan Bush War, he and his brother were reportedly chased by an attack helicopter. This helicopter can be seen in Who Killed Captain Alex?.

Career
As he had never been in a theatre, he relied mostly on his brothers and friends' descriptions of films that were just released theatrically. He went for a course in computer repair, but was forced to drop out after the first month due to lack of funds. Therefore, he started to learn filmmaking and its aspects in a self learning methods with his own trial-and-error experiences with cameras and editing equipment. At the age of 32, he began filmmaking as a profession. In 2005, Nabwana founded Ramon Film Productions: the name derived from his grandmothers, Rachel and Monica, which is later known as Wakaliwood.

His film production is based in his home where he began to produce and shoot music videos since 2009. Ramon Production has involved over 44 feature films. Some of the popular films produced by Ramon Productions are Who Killed Captain Alex?, Bad Black, and Tebaatusasula. The film Who Killed Captain Alex is known as the first action-packed film in Ugandan cinema.

After releasing Who Killed Captain Alex? in 2010, it quickly became internationally recognized and popular. The movie attracted super fans from around the world. With over 8 million views on YouTube, it is Nabwana's most popular film and it turned him into a minor celebrity.

Alan Hofmanis, a film festival director based in New York City, saw the film and became known as a super fan; he subsequently traveled to Uganda, met Nabwana and asked for producing a documentary on Ramon Film Productions. Hofmanis has since moved to Uganda to help promote Wakaliwood cinema worldwide and is now an executive producer and actor at Wakaliwood. He was also given a starring role in Nabwana's 2016 film Bad Black and has been called "the first Mzungu Ugandan action movie star."

According to IMDb, Nabwana has won 6 awards from various film festivals.

Filmmaking style and themes
Nabwana shoots his films in Luganda, the dialect of the Baganda, Uganda's largest tribe. Nabwana is known for his action and violence mixed in with comedy in his films. He takes the action in his films to new extremes which mainly consists of gun fighting to Kung-fu and martial arts. Additionally, Nabwana has a creation called the 'Video Joker' (or VJ for short) to do commentary over the movie in which the VJ says jokes and shouts random words. These traits have appeared in all of Nabwana's films.

Filmography

References

Living people
Ugandan film directors
Ugandan film producers
1973 births
People from Kampala